Moghuyeh (also Romanized as Moghūyeh; also known as Bandar-e Moghūyeh) is a village in Moghuyeh Rural District, in the Central District of Bandar Lengeh County, Hormozgan Province, Iran. At the 2006 census, its population was 1,032, in 194 families.

References 

Populated places in Bandar Lengeh County